Ferrimonas pelagia is a Gram-negative bacterium from the genus of Ferrimonas which has been isolated from seawater from the Jeju Island in Korea.

References

External links
Type strain of Ferrimonas pelagia at BacDive -  the Bacterial Diversity Metadatabase

Bacteria described in 2013
Alteromonadales